Pleasant Grove is an unincorporated community in Catoosa County, in the U.S. state of Georgia.

History
Pleasant Grove took its name from a local church of the same name.

References

Unincorporated communities in Catoosa County, Georgia
Unincorporated communities in Georgia (U.S. state)